Gong Yuanxing (born March 1952) is a former Chinese diplomat.

Biography
Gong was born in Shanghai, in March 1952. After university, he was assigned to the Ministry of Foreign Affairs. In 1975-1979 he was a staff member in the Chinese Embassy in the Republic of Niger. He returned to China in 1979 and that same year worked in the Translation Office of the Ministry of Foreign Affairs. In 1983, he pursued advanced studies in France, where he studied at the Bordeaux Montaigne University, University of Sorbonne Nouvelle Paris 3 and the Sciences Po. He returned to China in 1985 and worked in the Translation Office of the Ministry of Foreign Affairs. He served as counsellor of the Chinese Embassy in the Republic of Chad from 1996 to 1997 and counsellor of the Chinese Embassy of the Republic of Mali between 1997 and 2001. In 2001 he was appointed Chinese ambassador to Guinea, replacing Shi Tongning. He returned to China in 2004 and briefly served as deputy director of the Foreign Affairs Office of Guangxi Zhuang Autonomous Region. In 2005 he was appointed Chinese ambassador to Morocco. He served from 2005 through 2008. In 2009 he was appointed Chinese Ambassador to Senegal in succession to Lu Shaye. He retired from the Diplomatic Service in August 2012.

Personal life
Gong is married and has a daughter.

Award
In 2012, he was awarded the National Lion Medal by the President of Senegal Macky Sall.

References

1952 births
People from Shanghai
Living people
Bordeaux Montaigne University alumni
Sorbonne Nouvelle University Paris 3 alumni
Sciences Po alumni
Diplomats of the People's Republic of China
Ambassadors of China to Guinea
Ambassadors of China to Morocco
Ambassadors of China to Senegal